Alexei Fernando Ramírez Rodriguez (born September 22, 1981) is a Cuban former professional baseball shortstop. He has played for the Chicago White Sox, San Diego Padres and Tampa Bay Rays in MLB and Pinar del Rio of the Cuban National Series. His nickname, given to him by former White Sox manager Ozzie Guillén, is "The Cuban Missile" due to his tall, slim physique and combination of speed, power, and strong throwing arm. Ramírez batted and threw right-handed.

Early career
In seven years of baseball in the Cuban National Series, Ramírez spent most of his time playing shortstop and outfield for Pinar del Rio. He had a batting average of .332 in Cuba, and led the league in 2007 with 20 home runs while posting a .335 average. Ramírez played center field for Cuba at the 2006 World Baseball Classic, collecting six hits in 16 at-bats and impressing Major League Baseball scouts in the process.

Professional career

Chicago White Sox
In September 2007, Ramírez left Cuba to apply for citizenship in the Dominican Republic, and also apply to Major League Baseball to enter free agency, according to his agent, Jaime Torres. He auditioned for many baseball teams before coming to an agreement on a four-year, $8 million contract with the Chicago White Sox on December 21, 2007.

2008 season
Ramírez made his MLB debut on March 31, 2008 against the Cleveland Indians, finishing the game 0-for-4 as the starting center fielder. He recorded his first major league hit on April 2, a single off Indians reliever Jorge Julio. Ramírez hit his first major league home run on May 16, off San Francisco Giants reliever Billy Sadler.

Ramírez hit his first career grand slam on July 22, 2008. On September 19, Ramírez hit his third grand slam of the season off of pitcher Brian Bannister of the Kansas City Royals, tying an American League rookie record set by Shane Spencer of the New York Yankees in 1998. It was the White Sox's eleventh grand slam of the season, equaling the previous club record from 2006. On September 29, Ramírez hit his fourth grand slam of the season, setting a major-league single-season record for a rookie, off of Detroit Tigers pitcher Gary Glover in an 8–2 Sox victory to qualify the Sox for a one-game tiebreaker against the Minnesota Twins for the AL Central title. This also broke the team record for most grand slams in a single season.

During his first season in the Majors, Ramírez excelled both offensively and in the field, despite primarily playing second base instead of his customary shortstop position. Over 136 games, he posted a .290 batting average, hitting 21 homers and recording 77 RBI. He finished in second place in the voting for American League Rookie of the Year honors, losing to Evan Longoria of the Tampa Bay Rays. Ramírez led the major leagues in grand slam home runs in 2008, with four, and also swung at 59% of all pitches he saw for the season, also the most in the majors.

2009 season
Ramírez appeared in 148 games in his second MLB season. He posted a .277 batting average, 15 home runs, 68 RBI, and 15 stolen bases. He fielded a ground ball for the final out of Mark Buehrle's July 23, 2009 perfect game.

2010 season
Ramírez saw action in 156 games with Chicago. His batting average climbed to .282 and he tallied 18 homers and 70 RBI. He also won the American League Silver Slugger Award for the shortstop position.

2011 season
On January 31, 2011, Ramírez signed a four-year, $32.5 million contract with the White Sox that included a club option for a fifth year. In 158 games, Ramírez posted a .269 batting average, 15 home runs, and 70 RBI.

2012 season
Ramírez again appeared in 158 games, as his batting average dipped slightly to .265. His home run total decreased to nine, but he still had 73 RBI. He also set a new career high with 20 steals.

2013 season

For a third consecutive season, Ramírez saw action in exactly 158 games. His batting average of .284 was the highest since his rookie season. His power numbers fell further as he hit only six homers and recorded 48 RBI. He also stole 30 bases, surpassing his previous career best from the year before.

2014 season
On May 5, 2014, Ramírez recorded his 1,000th career hit off of Chicago Cubs' pitcher Justin Grimm in the 12th inning of the Crosstown Classic.

Ramírez was announced to his first All-Star game at the 2014 MLB All-Star Game along with teammates Chris Sale and fellow countryman José Abreu. He replaced Derek Jeter in the field in what was previously announced to be the Yankee star's final MLB season.

2015 season
On November 4, 2015, the White Sox declined Ramírez's $10 million option for the 2016 season, making him a free agent.

San Diego Padres
On January 22, 2016, Ramírez signed a one-year, $3 million contract with the San Diego Padres, with a $4 million mutual option for 2017. He broke up Steven Matz's no-hit bid with a RBI single in a game against the New York Mets on August 14, 2016. Ramírez appeared in 128 games with the Padres, mainly at shortstop. He batted .240, with five home runs and 41 RBI. He was released by the Padres on September 4.

Tampa Bay Rays
On September 8, 2016, Ramírez signed a major league deal with the Rays. He appeared in 17 games with Tampa Bay, tallying a .246 average, one home run, and 7 RBI. On November 3, Ramírez became a free agent.

Diablos Rojos del México
On February 8, 2018, Ramírez signed with the Diablos Rojos del México of the Mexican Baseball League. He was released by the team on August 16, 2018.

In May 2020, Ramírez announced he was still seeking professional baseball opportunities. He later confirmed his retirement the next year.

See also
List of baseball players who defected from Cuba

References

External links

1981 births
Living people
American League All-Stars
Baseball players at the 2004 Summer Olympics
Baseball players at the 2007 Pan American Games
Central American and Caribbean Games gold medalists for Cuba
Chicago White Sox players
Competitors at the 2006 Central American and Caribbean Games
Defecting Cuban baseball players
Diablos Rojos del México players
Leones del Escogido players
Cuban expatriate baseball players in the Dominican Republic
Major League Baseball players from Cuba
Cuban expatriate baseball players in the United States
Major League Baseball second basemen
Major League Baseball shortstops
Medalists at the 2004 Summer Olympics
Mexican League baseball shortstops
Olympic baseball players of Cuba
Olympic gold medalists for Cuba
Olympic medalists in baseball
Pan American Games gold medalists for Cuba
Pan American Games medalists in baseball
People from Pinar del Río
San Diego Padres players
Silver Slugger Award winners
Tampa Bay Rays players
Vegueros de Pinar del Rio players
2006 World Baseball Classic players
Central American and Caribbean Games medalists in baseball
Medalists at the 2007 Pan American Games
Cuban expatriate baseball players in Mexico